Superior Spider-Man Team-Up was an ongoing comic book series published by Marvel Comics that debuted in July 2013. The series is written by Christopher Yost with artwork by a rotating team of artists including David Lopez, Paolo Rivera, and Marco Checchetto. It is meant to serve as a direct successor to Avenging Spider-Man and a spiritual successor to Marvel Team-Up, whose name it plays on. It is also meant to act as an expansion of the Superior Spider-Man brand by Marvel.

Format
Like Marvel Team-Up and Avenging Spider-Man before it, Superior Spider-Man Team-Up features a team-up format where Spider-Man is partnered with a different character each issue. It will continue plot threads started in Avenging Spider-Man and run in tandem with Dan Slott's main Superior Spider-Man title.

Publication history
Superior Spider-Man Team-Up was announced in April 2013 as a part of Marvel's Superior brand expansion. Christopher Yost, writer of Superior Spider-Man Team-Up, said, "Well, in my heart when I say "Team-Up" for "Superior Spider-Man," I probably mean "Versus." In the latest "Avenging" issues, we've seen that he has a fairly contentious relationship with most of the heroes he's encountered. And with "Superior Spider-Man Team Up," that just gets bigger. I think in issue #1, he teams up with pretty much the entire Marvel Universe". 

Axel Alonso, Marvel's Editor-In-Chief, added "All I can say is, they had me at the title. I grew up loving "Marvel Team-Up." Bought every issue I could get my hands on. Every month Spider-Man would team up with someone new. There was even an issue where Iceman teamed up with the Human Torch. I was like, "What the—!?"...So it didn't take much for me to sign off on the series".

Issues

Collected editions

References

2013 comics debuts
Spider-Man titles